Quasi Self Boot 93–96 is a compilation album by the American indie band Quasi.

The compilation is self-released, and has been sold only at live shows beginning in 2006. The compilation features tracks from the band's self-released cassette from 1993, a few previously unreleased tracks, and the song "Ghidora–The Cat–From Bad to Worse" from their split 7-inch with Bugskull. Three of the tracks on the compilation are cover songs: "Sound & Vision" (originally by David Bowie), "Take Me With U" (originally by Prince and The Revolution), and "Life's a Gas" (originally by T. Rex).

Track listing
 "Sound & Vision" (David Bowie) - 4:26
 "Caveman" - 3:37
 "Buffalo Crap" - 2:04
 "Take Me with U" (Prince) - 4:00
 "Ghidorah–The Cat–From Bad to Worse" - 5:03
 "Life's a Gas" (Marc Bolan) - 4:14
 "2K's #1" - 1:18
 "When I'm Dead v.1" - 2:51

Quasi albums
Self-released albums
2006 compilation albums